Epidemiology is the study of the distribution and patterns of health-events, health-characteristics and their causes or influences in defined populations.

Epidemiology may also refer to:
 Epidemiology (journal)
 Epidemiology (Community), episode of the television series Community